Nicolaus Thomas Host (December 6, 1761 in Fiume, now Rijeka – January 13, 1834 in Schönbrunn) was a Croatian botanist and the personal physician of Holy Roman Emperor Francis II. 

His botanical works include Synopsis plantarum in Austria and the four-volume Austriacorum Icones et descriptions graminum; he was also the first director of the botanical garden at the Belvedere palace.

The genus Hosta is named for him.

References

1761 births
1834 deaths